Labyrinth is a 2002 Yugoslavian thriller film directed by Miroslav Lekic. It was selected as the Serbian entry for the Best Foreign Language Film at the 75th Academy Awards, but it was not nominated.

Cast
 Dragan Nikolic as Petar Aksentijevic 'Pop'
 Maja Sabljic as Suzana Lojtes
 Branislav Lecic as Milan Aksentijevic
 Katarina Radivojevic as Tamara Lojtes

See also
 List of submissions to the 75th Academy Awards for Best Foreign Language Film
 List of Serbian submissions for the Academy Award for Best Foreign Language Film

References

External links
 

2002 films
2002 thriller films
2000s Serbian-language films
Serbian thriller films
Films set in Belgrade
Films shot in Belgrade